The discography of Brazilian pop singer-songwriter Kelly Key consists of six studio album, two compilations, one live album and twenty-two singles. Key is one of the best-selling music pop artists of all-time in Brazil, with sales of over 2 million albums.

Albums

Studio albums

Live albums

Compilation albums

Spanish albums

Singles

As featured artist

Other songs

DVD

References

External links
 Official Website

Discographies of Brazilian artists
Pop music discographies
Latin music discographies